Anton Hård af Segerstad (earlier Anton Malmberg Hård af Segerstad) (born 28 December 1985) is a Swedish songwriter and producer, part of the production team "The Family" with Joy Deb and Linnea Deb.

His catalogue includes multiple award-winning songs and productions with artists like Iggy Azalea, Fifth Harmony, JoJo, MiC LOWRY, Dada Life, Nause, Loreen and Kim Cesarion.

Hård af Segerstad has also co-written several Melodifestivalen entries, the best known being "Heroes", performed by Måns Zelmerlöw, which won Melodifestivalen 2015 and the Eurovision Song Contest 2015.

Discography
As songwriter and producer

References

Swedish songwriters
Living people
Eurovision Song Contest winners
1985 births
Melodifestivalen contestants of 2011